Lemmenjoki National Park is situated in area of municipalities of Inari and Kittilä, Lapland, in Northern Finland. It was founded in 1956 and has since been expanded twice.

The park is partly bordered by the Øvre Anarjóhka National Park in Norway.

Around 100 people can be seen digging gold in the area in the summer on 40 claims. Most of the people in the park – around 10,000 people per year – are backpackers, though. There are about  marked paths in the national park, and even some bridges and boats are put up for travelers. There are more than ten free wilderness huts in the park and three chargeable, bookable ones.

The gold-digging area contains two small airfields, Martiniiskonpalo and Keurulainen (about ). They can be used for landing or taking off with small propeller planes.

See also 
 List of national parks of Finland
 Protected areas of Finland

References

External links
 
 
 Outdoors.fi – Lemmenjoki National Park
 Samuel Silhberpapier's pictures of Lemmenjoki

Protected areas of the Arctic
Protected areas established in 1956
Geography of Lapland (Finland)
Tourist attractions in Lapland (Finland)
Inari, Finland
Kittilä
Ramsar sites in Finland
National parks of Finland